The Biak leaf warbler (Phylloscopus misoriensis) is a species of Old World warbler in the family Phylloscopidae.
It is only found in Biak, Indonesia.

References

Biak leaf warbler
Birds of the Schouten Islands
Biak leaf warbler